Sir Walter Liath de Burgh (died February 1332) was an Anglo-Irish noble whose imprisonment by the Earl of Ulster and death from starvation led to the Earl's murder the following year.

De Burgh was the eldest son of Sir William Liath de Burgh and Finola Ni Briain. He is first attested in 1326 when he and the late Earl of Ulster's son, Sir Edmond de Burgh, were appointed guardians of the peace in Connacht, Tipperary and Limerick, and custodians of the late earl's lands in those counties.

De Burgh aggrandized the lordship of Connacht to himself such that in 1330, its lord, the Earl of Ulster, was forced into open conflict with de Burgh, who was his cousin. Warfare continued till November 1331 when the Earl captured Walter and his two brothers, imprisoning them in Northburgh Castle, County Donegal. Walter died there of starvation in February 1332.

Walter's sister, Gylle de Burgh, planned revenge on the earl. She persuaded her husband, Richard de Mandeville, and John de Logan, both liegemen of the earl, to murder the latter at Carrickfergus on 6 June 1333. This death was a catastrophe for the Anglo-Irish colony, as within six months all Ulster west of the Bann was lost, while Connacht descended into factionalism. For over two hundred years it would remain largely outside the realm of the Dublin government.

Walter was married to a woman called Margaret, and had one known child, Matilda. Margaret later married Aedh O Conchobair, a king of Connacht. She died in 1361. Matilda married William, son of Sir John Darcy.

See also
 Burke Civil War
 Mac William Iochtar
 Clanricarde

References

People from County Galway
People from County Mayo
14th-century Irish people
Walter Liath